Robotic sensors are used to estimate a robot's condition and environment. These signals are passed to a controller to enable appropriate behavior.

Sensors in robots are based on the functions of human sensory organs. Robots require extensive information about their environment in order to function effectively.

Classification 
Sensors provide analogs to human senses and can monitor other phenomena for which humans lack explicit sensors.
 Simple Touch: Sensing an object's presence or absence.
 Complex Touch: Sensing an object's size, shape and/or hardness.
 Simple Force: Measuring force along a single axis.
 Complex Force: Measuring force along multiple axes.
 Simple Vision: Detecting edges, holes and corners.
 Complex Vision: Recognizing objects.
 Proximity: Non-contact detection of an object.

Sensors can measure physical properties, such as the distance between objects, the presence of light and the frequency of sound.
They can measure:
 Object Proximity: The presence/absence of an object, bearing, color, distance between objects.
 Physical orientation. The co-ordinates of object in space.
 Heat: The wavelength of infrared or ultra violet rays, temperature, magnitude, direction.
 Chemicals: The presence, identity, and concentration of chemicals or reactants
 Sound: The presence, frequency, and intensity of sound.

Motion controllers, potentiometers, tacho-generators and encoder are used as joint sensors, whereas strain-gauge based sensing is used at the end-effector location for contact force control.

Internal sensor*
It is the part of the robot. Internal sensors measure the robot's internal state. They are used to measure position, velocity and acceleration of the robot joint or end effectors.

Position  sensor 

Position sensors measure the position of a joint (the degree to which the joint is extended). They include:
 Encoder: a digital optical device that converts motion into a sequence of digital pulses.
 Potentiometer: a variable resistance device that expresses linear or angular displacements in terms of voltage.
 Linear variable differential transformer: a displacement transducer that provides high accuracy. It generates an AC signal whose magnitude is a function of the displacement of a moving core.
 Synchros and Resolvers

Velocity Sensor 

A velocity or speed sensor measures consecutive position measurements at known intervals and computes the time rate of change in the position values.

Applications 

In a parts feeder, a vision sensor can eliminate the need for an alignment pallet. Vision-enabled insertion robots can precisely perform fitting and insertion operations of machine parts.

See also
 Robotic sensing
 Tactile sensor
 Robot locomotion
 Outline of robotics
 Robot App Store
 Liquid handling robot
 Glossary of robotics
 Index of robotics articles
 Mechatronics

References

Robotics hardware
Robotic sensing
Sensors